This is a list of properties on the National Register of Historic Places in northern New Castle County, Delaware.

This is intended to be a complete list of the properties and districts on National Register of Historic Places in New Castle County, Delaware north of the Chesapeake and Delaware Canal, excluding the city of Wilmington. The locations of National Register properties and districts for which the latitude and longitude coordinates are included below, may be seen in a map.

There are 397 properties and districts listed on the National Register in the county. Of those, 224 sites are located outside Wilmington and north of the Chesapeake and Delaware Canal, and are listed here, including five sites that are further designated as National Historic Landmarks.

Current listings

|}

See also

 National Register of Historic Places listings in Delaware
 List of National Historic Landmarks in Delaware

References

Buildings and structures in New Castle County, Delaware
North